39th (Skinners) Signal Regiment is an Army Reserve regiment in the Royal Corps of Signals in the British Army. The regiment forms part of 1 Signal Brigade, providing military communications for national operations. The Lynx badge is a reminder of the unit's connection with the Worshipful Company of Skinners.

History
The regiment was formed in 1967 by the amalgamation of 65th Signal Regiment and 92nd Signal Regiment, with some personnel from the disbanded Queen's Own Oxfordshire Hussars at Banbury.

In 1971 a new 5 (Banbury) Squadron was formed, which in 1975 became 5 (Queen's Own Oxfordshire Hussars) Signal Squadron.

47 (Middlesex Yeomanry) Signal Squadron at Uxbridge formed part of the regiment from 1995 to 2006, when it transferred to 71st (City of London) Yeomanry Signal Regiment.

In 2000, the North Somerset Yeomanry designation was revived for the Headquarters Squadron of 39th (Skinners) Signal Regiment  and, in 2008, that squadron, as 93 (North Somerset Yeomanry) Squadron, became the Regiment's Support Squadron.

In 2006, 94 (Berkshire Yeomanry) Squadron transferred from 31st (City of London) Signal Regiment.

In 2014, under Army 2020, 43 (Wessex and City & County of Bristol) Signal Squadron transferred from 21st Signal Regiment and 53 (Welsh) Signal Squadron transferred from 37th Signal Regiment, while 5 (QOOH) Squadron transferred to the Royal Logistic Corps.

Current structure
The current structure of the regiment is as follows:

 Regimental Headquarters, in Bristol
 43 (Wessex and City & County of Bristol) Signal Squadron, in Bath
 857 (City and County of Bristol) Signal Troop, in Bristol
 53 (Wales and Western) Signal Squadron, in Cardiff
 Western Signal Troop, in Gloucester
93 (North Somerset Yeomanry) Support Squadron, in Bristol
 94 (Berkshire Yeomanry) Signal Squadron, in Windsor

Honours
Freedom of the City of Bristol in 2019.

See also
 Units of the Royal Corps of Signals

Notes

References
 Cliff Lord & Graham Watson, Royal Corps of Signals: Unit Histories of the Corps (1920–2001) and its Antecedents, Solihull: Helion, 2003, .

External links 
 A Brief History of 39 (Skinners) Signal Regiment
 Land Forces of Britain, the Empire and Commonwealth – Regiments.org (archive site)

Regiments of the Royal Corps of Signals
Army Reserve (United Kingdom)